The Old Catholic Archdiocese of Utrecht is an archdiocese within the Old Catholic Church of the Netherlands which split from the Archdiocese of Utrecht officially in 1723 because of the illicit consecration of Cornelius van Steenoven to the episcopate.

The first Old Catholic archbishop of Utrecht was elected in 1723. The Old Catholic archbishop of Utrecht is automatically the president of the International Old Catholic Bishops' Conference of the Union of Utrecht.

Since 2020, its archbishop is Bernd Wallet.

List of bishops
 Cornelius van Steenoven (1723–1725)
 Cornelius Johannes Barchman Wuytiers (1725–1733)
 Theodorus van der Croon (1734–1739)
 Petrus Johannes Meindaerts (1739–1767)
 Walter van Nieuwenhuisen (1768–1797)
 Johannes Jacobus van Rhijn (1797–1808)
 Willibrord van Os (1814–1825)
 Johannes van Santen (1825–1858)
 Henricus Loos (1858–1873)
 Johannes Heijkamp (1875–1892)
 Gerardus Gul (1892–1920)
 Franciscus Kenninck (1920–1937)
 Andreas Rinkel (1937–1970)
 Marinus Kok (1970–1982)
 Antonius Jan Glazemaker (1982–2000)
 Joris Vercammen (2000–2020)
 Bernd Wallet (2020-present)

See also
Episcopal principality of Utrecht
Holland (Batavia) Mission
Lordship of Utrecht

Catholicism in the Netherlands
Utrecht
Religious organizations established in the 1720s